Ali Gholamzadeh (born 13 February 2000) is an Iranian footballer who plays as a goalkeeper for Persian Gulf Pro League side Foolad.

Career statistics

Club

Notes

Honours 
Foolad
Hazfi Cup: 2020–21
Iranian Super Cup: 2021

Iran U16
 AFC U-16 Championship runner-up: 2016

References

2000 births
Living people
Iranian footballers
Persian Gulf Pro League players
Foolad FC players
Association football goalkeepers
Sportspeople from Khuzestan province